Asbjørn Aarnes (20 December 1923 – 8 January 2013) was a Norwegian professor and literary historian.

Biography
He was born at Vågbø in  Tingvoll, Norway. He studied from 1951-52 at École Normale Supérieure in Paris.  In 1957, Aarnes became Dr. Philos. at the University of Oslo.

He was appointed professor at the University of Oslo from 1964. He was professor of European literary history from 1964 to 1993, as well as head of literature department from 1966 to 1970. He also several published works on French literature and on Norwegian poets. He was co-editor of the book series Idé og tanke, jointly with Egil A. Wyller, and principal editor of the book series Thorleif Dahls Kulturbibliotek from 1978 to 2001.  In 1963 he was admitted to the Norwegian Academy and presided over from 1967-82.  From 2005, he wrote a column for Dag og Tid.

Awards
Aarnes became a member of the Norwegian Academy of Sciences in 1983. He received several French honorary decorations, including l'Ordre national du Mérite in 1970, the Légion d'Honneur in 1979 and l'Ordre des Palmes Académiques in 1984. He was the first recipient of the Anders Jahre cultural prize (Anders Jahres kulturpris) which he received jointly with sculptor Nils Aas in 1990.

Personal life
In 1950, he married  Berit Alten (1915–2002), daughter of Edvin Alten (1876–1967) and Ragna Aass (1880–1975). She was the younger sister of actress Rønnaug Alten (1910– 2001).

References

1923 births
2013 deaths
People from Møre og Romsdal
University of Oslo alumni
Academic staff of the University of Oslo
Norwegian literary historians
Members of the Norwegian Academy of Science and Letters
Recipients of the Legion of Honour
Recipients of the Ordre national du Mérite
Recipients of the Ordre des Palmes Académiques
Norwegian columnists
École Normale Supérieure alumni
 Norwegian expatriates in France